Mannum is a town in the Australian state of South Australia.

Mannum may also refer to.

District Council of Mannum, a former local government area in South Australia
Mannum Waterfalls, a waterfall of Australia
Mannum Football Club, a South Australian football club
Mannum Formation, a geological formation in South Australia 
Mannum Rowing Club, an Australian rowing club

See also
Mannum–Adelaide pipeline
Adelaide–Mannum Road
Mannum Mercury and Farmer's Journal